Frederick Rollin Feitshans (March 4, 1881 – January 11, 1952) was an American tennis player. He competed in the men's singles event at the 1904 Summer Olympics. His grandson is Buzz Feitshans, producer.

References

External links
 

1881 births
1952 deaths
American male tennis players
Olympic tennis players of the United States
Tennis players at the 1904 Summer Olympics
Tennis people from Illinois